"Love in the Way" is song by American rappers Yung Bleu and Nicki Minaj. It was released on September 16, 2022, through Moon Boy University and Empire Distribution as the second single from Yung Bleu's second studio album Tantra. The song samples "Whole" by British singer Sam Tompkins. Lyrically, it is a break-up song, with the two artists "bemoan[ing] how it hurts to love again in the aftermath of an intense relationship."

Music video
The song's official music video dropped on September 22, 2022. The video opens with Minaj in a "pink peacock-esque" bodysuit atop a golden throne, with Bleu joining in from a balcony in between two "futuristic" buildings. These solo shots are interspersed with the two accompanied by backup dancers in "sleek African attire."

Charts

Release history

References

2022 songs
2022 singles
Nicki Minaj songs
Yung Bleu songs
Songs written by Nicki Minaj
Empire Distribution singles